The Wofford Lookout Complex consists of an  fire lookout tower and associated buildings in Lincoln National Forest in Otero County, New Mexico.

Wofford Lookout Complex was built in 1933 and added to the National Register of Historic Places on January 28, 1988, as part of a thematic group of United States Forest Service fire lookouts in the forest service's Southwestern Region.

Gallery

See also

National Register of Historic Places listings in Otero County, New Mexico

References

External links

Fire lookout towers on the National Register of Historic Places in New Mexico
Towers completed in 1933
Government buildings on the National Register of Historic Places in New Mexico
National Register of Historic Places in Otero County, New Mexico